Zisserdorf is the name of the following places:

 Drosendorf-Zissersdorf, Horn District, Lower Austria, Austria
 A cadastral community in Hausleiten, Korneuburg District, Lower Austria, Austria

See also
 Zistersdorf, a town in Gänserndorf, Lower Austria, Austria